Franco Pardo (born 5 April 1997) is an Argentine professional footballer who plays as a centre-back for Chilean club Palestino.

Career
Pardo started his Belgrano career in May 2017, making his professional debut on 8 May in an away win versus Vélez Sarsfield as a second half substitute for Matías Suárez. Having suffered a serious knee injury soon after, Pardo returned to the first-team set-up in May 2019 for a Copa Argentina encounter with Deportivo Riestra.

In February 2021, Pardo joined Estudiantes de Río Cuarto. A year later, in February 2022, Pardo moved to Chilean Primera División club Palestino.

Career statistics
.

References

External links

1997 births
Living people
Argentine footballers
Argentine expatriate footballers
Footballers from Córdoba, Argentina
Association football defenders
Argentine Primera División players
Primera Nacional players
Chilean Primera División players
Club Atlético Belgrano footballers
Estudiantes de Río Cuarto footballers
Club Deportivo Palestino footballers
Argentine expatriate sportspeople in Chile
Expatriate footballers in Chile